Subak-hwachae or watermelon punch is a variety of hwachae (punch) in which watermelon is a primary ingredient. It is widely consumed during summer throughout Korea to keep cool in hot temperatures.

Preparation 
Watermelon is cut in half, and the interior flesh is either scooped out using a melon baller or cut into small pieces with a knife. Then the seeds are removed. The hollowed watermelon rind may be cut decoratively and used as the serving bowl for hwachae. Watermelon juice, sweeteners like sugar and honey, and sometimes water are also added to the punch. To complete the preparation, scooped or sliced watermelon pieces, bits of other fruits, and ice cubes are put in the bowl. Occasionally, soju is thrown in the mix as well.

See also 
 Omija-hwachae
 List of Korean beverages
 List of melon dishes

References 

Hwachae
Melon dishes